Pratola may refer to several places in Italy:

Pratola Peligna, a municipality in the Province of L'Aquila, Abruzzo
Pratola Serra, a municipality in the Province of Avellino, Campania
Pratola Ponte, a locality of Pomigliano d'Arco (NA), Campania